The Jupitagon River is a salmon river in the Côte-Nord region of Quebec, Canada. It flows south through boreal forests from the Canadian Shield to the Gulf of Saint Lawrence. In 2018 salmon fishing was banned on the river due to critically low stocks.

Location

The Jupitagon River flows south to the Saint Lawrence between the Magpie River to the east and the Tonnerre River to the west.
The mouth of the river is in the municipality of Rivière-Saint-Jean in the Minganie Regional County Municipality.

At the start of the 20th century there was a hamlet called Jupitagon at the mouth of the river where some fishermen's families lived.
In 1903 there was a Eudist missionary station at the mouth of the river.
Père Arthur Gallant (1896-1976) was a Eudist missionary at Rivière-Saint-Jean with responsibility for the dessertes of Longue-Pointe-de-Mingan, Magpie and Jupitagon from 1928 to 1938.
Today the location is used by vacationers.

Name

The Innu of Mingan call the river the Atshukupakatan Hipis or Atshukukupitan Hipis, meaning "little river with the sea-lion".

On the 1744 map by Charlevoix, published by Jacques-Nicolas Bellin in the Histoire générale de la Nouvelle-France (General History of New France),  the Jupitagon River is referred to as Ouapitougan.
The name is written by different sources as Jupitagun, Jupitagan, Jupitagone and Chipitagun.
Some say it is derived from the Innu language ouapitagon or shusshupitagan meaning "river with sharpening-stones".
Others claim that the word is a distortion of the Cree and Atikamekw chiwitagan, which means "salt". 

Basin

It lies between the basins of the Tonnerre River to the west and the Magpie River to the east.

The coastal plain and a small section to the northwest are on orthopyroxene granitoid rocks.
The remainder is on an anorthosite massif.
On the coastal plain the Goldthwait Sea deposited large quantities of marine clay and silt sediments, which were later covered by sandy deltaic sediments.

Hydrology

The streams and rivers follow angular courses dictated by the fractures of the bedrock.
On the plateau and in the piedmont area the rivers mostly flow through straight V-shaped valleys, although the Jupitagon River flows through an old U-shaped glacial valley in the center of the catchment area, where it has a winding course.
On the coastal plain the river and its tributaries make many meanders through the loose sediment.

The river has two sizable tributaries, the Petite rivière au Foin in the southeast part and an unnamed stream in the southwest.

There are many water bodies, covering 8.22% of the watershed.
Most are long and narrow, oriented from north to south.
Ombrotrophic bogs cover 2.29% of the basin, mostly on the coastal plain.
There are few flat surfaces further inland where wetlands can develop, and no large wetlands.

Environment

Temperatures would be lower inland.

A map of the ecological regions of Quebec shows the Jupitagon in sub-regions 6j-T and 6m-T of the east spruce/moss subdomain.
Black spruce (Picea mariana) forest dominates the coastal plain.
Inland in the piedmont and plateau area the forest is a mix of black spruce and balsam fir (Abies balsamea), with mossy groundcover.
There was a serious infestation of hemlock looper moths (Lambdina fiscellaria) in the late 1990s and early 2000s which caused widespread defoliation of the fir trees.

The north shore of the Gulf of Saint Lawrence from the mouth of the Jupitagon to Magpie harbor is the Waterfowl Concentration Area of the Jupitagon River, Magpie Harbor (Aire de concentration d'oiseaux aquatiques de la Rivière Jupitagon, Havre de Magpie), designated an IUCN Management Category IV water fowl gathering area since 1998.
It is managed by the Quebec Ministère des Forêts, de la Faune et des Parcs.

Fish

An 1859 account said that salmon were plentiful.
The downstream section of the Jupitagon River is known as an Atlantic salmon river, but there is an impassable fall within  from its mouth, which would prevent migration.
Between 1984 and 2017 annual reported catches of salmon peaked at 92 in 1990 and since then steadily declined, with an average of 4 per year in 2012–2016.
Some of the decline may have been due to fishing restrictions.
Other species are brook trout (Salvelinus fontinalis), American eel (Anguilla rostrata), rainbow smelt (Osmerus mordax) and three-spined stickleback (Gasterosteus aculeatus).

In May 2015 the Ministry of Forests, Wildlife and Parks of Quebec announced a sport fishing catch-and-release program for large salmon on sixteen of Quebec's 118 salmon rivers.
These were the Mitis, Laval, Pigou, Bouleau, Aux Rochers, Jupitagon, Magpie, Saint-Jean, Corneille, Piashti, Watshishou, Little Watshishou, Nabisipi, Aguanish and Natashquan rivers.
The Quebec Atlantic Salmon Federation said that the measures did not go nearly far enough in protecting salmon for future generations.
In view of the rapidly declining Atlantic salmon population catch-and-release should have been implemented on all rivers apart from northern Quebec.

On 1 April 2018 sport fishing for salmon in the Jupitagon River was prohibited, since the population was critically low.
Fishing for other species was allowed, but if a salmon were caught it must be returned to the water.

Notes

Sources

 

Rivers of Côte-Nord